A boutique firm is a small firm offering specialized services, such as:

 Boutique investment bank
 Boutique law firm